The 1982 Toyota Swiss Open was a women's tennis tournament played on outdoor clay courts at the Lido Club in Lugano, Switzerland that was part of the Toyota Series of the 1982 WTA Tour. The tournament was held from 10 May until 16 May 1982. First-seeded Chris Evert-Lloyd won the singles title and earned $18,000 first-prize money.

Finals

Singles
 Chris Evert-Lloyd defeated  Andrea Temesvári 6–0, 6–3
It was Evert-Lloyd's 4th singles title of the year and the 114th of her career.

Doubles
 Candy Reynolds /  Paula Smith defeated  Jennifer Russell /  Virginia Ruzici 6–2, 6–4

Prize money

References

External links
 ITF tournament edition details

Swiss Open
WTA Swiss Open
1982 in Swiss women's sport
1982 in Swiss tennis